Claíomh Solais, rendered as the "Sword of Light", is a sword that appears in Irish mythology.

Claíomh Solais or Claidheamh Soluis may also refer to:
An Claidheamh Soluis, a Gaelic League (Conradh na Gaeilge) journal edited by Eoin MacNeill and Patrick Pearse, among others
An Claíomh Solais, the second novel by Dublin novelist Liam Mac Cóil, published in 1998
Shiny Rod, the name of the Claíomh Solais used by Shiny Chariot and, later, Atsuko Kagari, in the anime series Little Witch Academia